The 2021–22 Indiana State Sycamores men's basketball team represented Indiana State University in the 2021–22 NCAA Division I men's basketball season. The Sycamores, led by first-year head coach Josh Schertz, played their home games at the Hulman Center in Terre Haute, Indiana as members of the Missouri Valley Conference.

Previous season
In a season limited due to the ongoing COVID-19 pandemic, the Sycamores finished the 2020–21 season 15–10, 11–7 in MVC play to finish in fourth place. They defeated Evansville in the quarterfinals of the MVC tournament before losing to Loyola in the semifinals.

Offseason

Coaching changes
On March 7, 2021, Indiana State announced that head coach Greg Lansing's contract would not be renewed, thereby ending his 11-year tenure at the school. On March 17, the Sycamores hired Josh Schertz, former head coach at Division II Lincoln Memorial, as Lansing's replacement.

Roster

Schedule and results

|-
!colspan=9 style=| Exhibition

|-
!colspan=9 style=| Regular season

|-
!colspan=12 style=| MVC Tournament

References

Indiana State Sycamores men's basketball seasons
Indiana State Sycamores
Indiana State Sycamores men's basketball
Indiana State Sycamores men's basketball